Habib-ur-Rehman Ludhianvi (3 July 1892 – 2 September 1956) was one of the founders of Majlis-e-Ahrar-e-Islam. He belonged to an Arain (tribe) and was a direct lineal descendant of Shah Abdul Qadir Ludhianvi, the freedom fighter against British Colonial rule during the Indian Rebellion of 1857.

Biography

Family history
Habib-ur-Rehman Ludhianvi's grandfather Shah Abdul Qadir Ludhianvi led an armed rebellion against the British East India Company during the Indian Rebellion of 1857 and was among the first ones to rebel against them from the Punjab. He gathered a large fighting force that drove the British out of not only Ludhiana but also Panipat. This fighting force included Muslims, Hindus and Sikhs. He then proceeded to Delhi to support the Mughal emperor Bahadur Shah Zafar. He gave his life fighting along with thousands of others at Chandni Chowk, Delhi in 1857.
Habib-ur-Rehman Ludhianvi was born on 3 July 1892 at Ludhiana, British India. He married Bibi Shafatunnisa, the daughter of Abdul Aziz.

Early life and career
Ludhianvi was one of the founders of Majlis-e-Ahrar-ul-Islam, a nationalist movement that wanted an end to the British rule in India. He chose to stay back in East Punjab, India to represent thousands of Muslims still remaining there, after the partition and the independence of Pakistan on 14 August 1947. He argued, at that time, that the remaining Muslims in East Punjab should not be abandoned. Ludhiana is considered a major industrial city of Punjab, India. A large number of working Muslims from the provinces of Uttar Pradesh and Bihar also come there to work.

References

External links
Majlis-e-Ahrar-ul-Islam homepage (Pakistan, in Urdu language)

1892 births
1956 deaths
Deobandis
Indian political party founders
People from British India
Indian Islamic religious leaders
Presidents of Majlis-e-Ahrar-ul-Islam
Politicians from Ludhiana